The 2019 Pac-12 Conference men's basketball tournament presented by New York Life was a postseason men's basketball tournament for the Pac-12 Conference played from March 13–16, 2019, at T-Mobile Arena on the Las Vegas Strip in Paradise, Nevada. No. 6 seed Oregon Ducks upset No. 1 seed Washington 68–48 in the championship, receiving the conference's automatic bid to the 2019 NCAA tournament. Payton Pritchard of Oregon was named the tournament's Most Outstanding Player.

Seeds
All 12 Pac-12 schools were eligible to participate in the tournament. Teams were seeded by conference record, with a tiebreaker system used to seed teams with identical conference records. As a result, the top four teams receive a bye to the quarterfinals of the tournament. 

Tie-breaking procedures for determining all tournament seeding was:
For two-team tie
1. Results of head-to-head competition during the regular season.

2. Each team's record (won-lost percentage) vs. the team occupying the highest position in the final regular standings, and then continuing down through the standings until one team gains an advantage. 
When arriving at another group of tied teams while comparing records, use each team's record (won-lost percentage) against the collective tied teams as a group (prior to that group's own tie-breaking procedure), rather than the performance against individual tied teams.

3. Won-lost percentage against all Division I opponents.

4. Coin toss conducted by the Commissioner or designee.

For multiple-team tie
1. Results (won-lost percentage) of collective head-to-head competition during the regular season among the tied teams.

2. If more than two teams are still tied, each of the tied team's record (won-lost percentage) vs. the team occupying the highest position in the final regular season standings, and then continuing down through the standings, eliminating teams with inferior records, until one team gains an advantage.

When arriving at another group of tied teams while comparing records, use each team's record (won-lost percentage) against the collective tied teams as a group (prior to that group's own tie-breaking procedure), rather than the performance against individual tied teams.

After one team has an advantage and is seeded, all remaining teams in the multiple-team tie-breaker will repeat the multiple-team tie-breaking procedure.

If at any point the multiple-team tie is reduced to two teams, the two-team tie-breaking procedure will be applied.

3. Won-lost percentage against all Division I opponents.

4. Coin toss conducted by the Commissioner or designee.

Schedule

Bracket
* denotes overtime period

Game statistics

First round

Quarterfinals

Semifinals

Championship

Awards and honors

Team and tournament leaders

All-Tournament Team

Most Outstanding Player

Tournament notes
Tournament winner Oregon was awarded the automatic bid to the 2019 NCAA Division I men's basketball tournament and was the 12 seed in the South Regional. They lost in the regional semi-finals to the 1 seed and eventual national champion, Virginia.
Regular season winner Washington gained an at-large bid to the 2019 tournament as a 9 seed in the Midwest
Arizona State received an at-large bid in the First Four as an 11 seed in the West.

Hall of Honor 
The 2019 class of the Pac-12 Hall of Honor, honored on March 15 during a ceremony prior to the tournament semifinals, included Meg Ritchie-Stone (Arizona), Frank Kush (Arizona State), Natalie Coughlin (California), Lisa Van Goor (Colorado), Bev Smith (Oregon), Dick Fosbury (Oregon State), Dick Gould (Stanford), Ann Meyers Drysdale (UCLA), Ronnie Lott (USC), Steve Smith Sr. (Utah), Trish Bostrom (Washington), and John Olerud (Washington State).

See also

2019 Pac-12 Conference women's basketball tournament

References

External links
Official website - Pac-12 Conference men's basketball tournament

Pac-12 Conference men's basketball tournament
2018–19 Pac-12 Conference men's basketball season
Pac-12 Conference men's basketball tournament